Ahmed Kuftaro or Ahmad Kaftaru (Arabic: أحمد كفتارو; December 1915 – 1 September 2004) was the Grand Mufti of Syria, the highest officially appointed Sunni Muslim representative of the Fatwa-Administration in the Syrian Ministry of Auqaf in Syria. Kaftaro was a Sunni Muslim of the Naqshbandi Sufi order.

Biography 
The family of Kuftaro is Kurdish who have their origins in the village of Karma in Ömerli District of Mardin Province, Turkey. In 1878, the Kuftaro family moved to Damascus and settled near the Abu al-Nur mosque in the Kurdish quarter. Kuftaro's father, Amin Kuftaro, received a traditional education and started working at the Sa'id Pasha mosque. His first wife was Najiya Sinjabi and he had four sons and two daughters with her: Musa, Taufiq, Ahmad, Ibrahim, Zaynab and Fatima. With his second wife, Is'af Badir, he had three children, Rabi', 'Abd al-Qadir and Rabi'a.

Classic education in Damascus
Kuftaro's father insisted that he first receive a classic education in Quran, Tafsir, Hadith and Islamic jurisprudence, namely Shafi'i Madhhab with Muslim scholars in Damascus.

Career in the Ifta' Administration 
In 1948, Kuftaro worked as a mosque teacher in Quneitra before moving to Damascus in 1950. Two years later, he became Mufti of the Shafi'i Madhhab in Damascus and a member of the Higher Ifta Council under Colonel Adib al-Shishakli. Kuftaro's political instinct aligned him with the Syrian Baath Party in 1955. He reportedly supported the Baath Party candidate in the 1955 election for an open seat in parliament.

Advocacy of interreligious dialogue 
Ahmad Kaftaru advocated interreligious dialogue. He visited many countries as a representative of Syrian state Islam, including a 1985 visit with the Pope in Rome. He signed the Amman Message, a statement calling for tolerance and unity in the Muslim world that was issued on 9 November 2004 (27 Ramadan 1425 AH) by King Abdullah II bin Al-Hussein of Jordan.

References

External links 
 Kaftaru Homepage 
 Obituary for Kuftaro in Islamica Magazine
 Homepage of Shaikh Ahmad Kaftaru Center, former Abu al-Nur Center

1915 births
2004 deaths
Syrian Kurdish people
Syrian imams
20th-century Muslim scholars of Islam
Syrian Sunni Muslims
20th-century imams
21st-century imams
Syrian Sufi religious leaders
Grand Muftis of Syria
People from Damascus